Trešnjevka – jug ("Trešnjevka – south") is a district of Zagreb, Croatia. It is in the western part of the city and has 66,674 inhabitants (2011 census).

The district encompasses the southern part of the traditional Trešnjevka neighbourhood, separated from the northern part by the Zagrebačka Avenue.

List of neighborhoods in Trešnjevka – jug
 Horvati
 Gajevo
 Jarun
 Knežija
 Prečko
 Srednjaci
 Staglišće
 Vrbani
 Gredice

References

External links
 unofficial web site of Prečko

Districts of Zagreb
Jug